Bismuth(III) iodide is the inorganic compound with the formula BiI3. This gray-black salt is the product of the reaction of bismuth and iodine, which once was of interest in qualitative inorganic analysis.

Bismuth(III) iodide adopts a distinctive crystal structure, with iodide centres occupying a hexagonally closest-packed lattice, and bismuth centres occupying either none or two-thirds of the octahedral holes (alternating by layer), therefore it is said to occupy one third of the total octahedral holes.

Synthesis
Bismuth(III) iodide forms upon heating an intimate mixture of iodine and bismuth powder:

2Bi + 3I2 → 2BiI3

BiI3 can also be made by the reaction of bismuth oxide with aqueous hydroiodic acid:
Bi2O3(s) + 6HI(aq) → 2BiI3(s) + 3H2O(l)

Reactions
Since bismuth(III) iodide is insoluble in water, an aqueous solution can be tested for the presence of Bi3+ ions by adding a source of iodide such as potassium iodide. A black precipitate of bismuth(III) iodide indicates a positive test.

Bismuth(III) iodide forms iodobismuth(III) anions when heated with halide donors:
2 NaI + BiI3 → Na2[BiI5]

Bismuth(III) iodide catalyzes the Mukaiyama aldol reaction. Bi(III) is also used in a Barbier type allylation of carbonyl compounds in combination with a reducing agent such as zinc or magnesium.

References

Bismuth iodide
Iodides
Metal halides